Diamond Bluff is a census-designated place in the town of Diamond Bluff, Pierce County, Wisconsin, United States. Its population was 194 as of the 2010 census.

References

Census-designated places in Pierce County, Wisconsin
Census-designated places in Wisconsin